Sickboy is the name of a street artist from Bristol, UK, known for his temple logo and his 'Save the Youth' slogan. Sickboy moved to London in 2007 and his street art became prevalent particularly in the East End boroughs of Shoreditch and Tower Hamlets. It is claimed Sickboy was one of the first UK graffiti artists to use a logo instead of a 'tag'.

Sickboy originally trained in fine art and, as well as painting graffiti on the street, he also paints on canvas and exhibits conventionally in art galleries. He has been painting street art since circa 1995. In recent years Sickboy has become known for painting his 'temple' logo on wheelie bins, which can then be worth up to £50,000.

In a 2011 article The Guardian article Sickboy named Spanish street artist La Mano as a major influence. He said "At the time, graffiti was mainly seen as letter-based, but [Le Mano] just used a logo and repeated it... I'd never been a big fan of stencil work, which is where a lot of people think graffiti crosses over into more acceptable street art. La Mano stuck more closely to the graffiti aspect, which I try to adhere to now. I like the freehand, grab-a-tin-of-spray-paint approach".

References 

English graffiti artists
Pseudonymous artists
Artists from Bristol
Living people
Year of birth missing (living people)